Robert Bratton (September 26, 1918 – April 29, 2008) was an American sound editor who was nominated twice at the Academy Awards for Best Sound Editing.

Oscar nominations

1963 Academy Awards-Nominated for A Gathering of Eagles. Lost to It's a Mad, Mad, Mad, Mad World.
1964 Academy Awards-Nominated for The Lively Set. Lost to Goldfinger.

References

External links

1918 births
2008 deaths
American sound editors
Place of birth missing
People from Santa Clara, California